Rogovin is a surname, and may refer to:

Milton Rogovin, American documentary photographer
Mitchell Rogovin, American civil liberties lawyer and government counsel
Saul Rogovin,  American professional baseball player
Vadim Rogovin, Russian Marxist historian and sociologist
M. A. Rogovin, Russian civil engineer